Frank Lester may refer to:
 Frank Lester (VC) (1896–1918), English soldier and recipient of the Victoria Cross
 Frank Lester (fighter) (born 1984), American mixed martial artist
 Frank Lester (footballer) (1870–?), English footballer for Birmingham City F.C.
 Frank Lester, alternative pen-name of author Charles Franklin